Brad Bradford is a Canadian politician and urban planner who has represented Ward 19 Beaches—East York on Toronto City Council since 2018. He has been the chair of the planning and housing committee since 2022.

Background 
Prior to his election, Bradford worked as an urban planner for the City of Toronto. He holds a Bachelor of Environmental Studies (BES), in urban and regional environments from York University, and a Master of Arts (MA) in urban planning from the University of Waterloo.

Family 
Bradford's mother, Valerie Bradford, was elected as the member of Parliament (MP) for Kitchener South—Hespeler in the 2021 federal election. He has one daughter, Briar, with his wife Kathryn.

Political career

First term

2018 election 

During the 2018 municipal election campaign, Bradford received endorsements from Mayor John Tory, Deputy Mayor Ana Bailão, former Liberal member of Provincial Parliament (MPP) Arthur Potts, Councillor Mary-Margaret McMahon (the previous incumbent of ward 32, which made up a part of the current ward boundaries), and former Toronto chief planner and mayoral candidate Jennifer Keesmaat. 

Bradford defeated candidate Matthew Kellway, who represented Beaches—East York federally from 2011 to 2015 as the New Democratic MP.

Boards and committees 
Bradford was appointed a commissioner of the Toronto Transit Commission Board by city council on December 13, 2018. He also sits on several council committees, including the Budget Committee, and the Planning and Housing Committee, and the Toronto Parking Authority Board.

Term limits 
Bradford brought a motion to the city council to explore implementing term limits, which was seconded by Ana Bailão and referred to the Special Committee on Governance. Bradford campaigned on supporting a two term limit during the 2018 election, with his motion citing examples where term limits facilitated a more representative council makeup by eliminating incumbent advantage. He was opposed by Councillor Gord Perks, who commented that the "last thing a government should do is tell people who they are allowed to vote for" and Councillor Jim Karygiannis, who believes if "constituents don’t want us they can kick us out".

The motion was deferred indefinitely, but if successful it would have required a City of Toronto Act amendment, which must be passed by the provincial government.

Hansard transcripts 
Bradford also introduced a motion at council to explore the use of Hansard (transcripts of meetings) to increase transparency and engagement at City Hall.

Second term

2022 election 

Bradford campaigned on the need for affordable housing, to improve parks, improving transportation, and reducing crime in the 2022 election. He ran against five other candidates and was endorsed by Mayor John Tory.

Planning and housing chair 
Following the 2022 election, Bradford was appointed as the chair of the affordable planning and housing committee.

Election results

References

External links 
 City of Toronto webpage

Canadian urban planners
Toronto city councillors
University of Waterloo alumni
York University alumni
Living people
Place of birth missing (living people)
1986 births